The International Steering Group for Kosovo (ISG) was an organization formed pursuant to the Ahtisaari Plan concerning the Kosovo status process. It was set up to guide Kosovo's democratic development and promote good governance, multi-ethnicity and the rule of law.

The group was responsible for appointing and overseeing the International Civilian Representative for Kosovo (ICR). The ICR was the "final authority in Kosovo regarding interpretation" of the Plan and had the "ability to annul decisions or laws adopted by Kosovo authorities and sanction and remove public officials whose actions he/she determined to be inconsistent" with the Plan. The European Union Special Representative (EUSR) for Kosovo (appointed by the Council of the European Union) was re-appointed by the ISG as the ICR.

The 2008 Kosovo declaration of independence formally "accept[ed] fully the obligations" of the Ahtisaari Plan. It had its inaugural meeting on Thursday February 28, 2008. The group has been declared "illegal" by Serbia and condemned by Russia.

On 10 September 2012, the International Steering Group had its final meeting and formally ended its supervision,
 and Kosovo became responsible for its own governance.

Members 
There are 25 countries which were members of the Steering Group, 15 of which were at its formation with ten others joining later. Every country in the group recognized Kosovo's declaration of independence.

The draft Ahtisaari Plan originally defined the ISG as composed of:
 
 
 
 
 
 
 
 European Commission
 NATO

The ISG held that "one of the criteria for becoming member of ISG was recognition [of Kosovo’s independence]." The Group was composed of 20 EU member states and five non-EU countries.

 
 
 
  (joined 30 June 2008)
 
 
 
 
 
 
 
 
 
 
  (joined 30 June 2008)
 
 
  (joined 30 June 2008)

See also

Kosovo status process
European Union Rule of Law Mission in Kosovo (EULEX)
Peace Implementation Council

Notes

References

External links 
 First meeting of International Steering Group for Kosovo held in Vienna International Herald Tribune

Politics of Kosovo
Political organizations based in Kosovo
1999 in Kosovo
2008 establishments in Kosovo
2012 disestablishments in Kosovo
2000s in Kosovo
2010s in Kosovo